Treaty of Pereiaslav was signed in late June 1630 between rebellious Cossack forces of Taras Fedorovych (see Fedorovych Uprising) and Polish forces led by hetman Stanisław Koniecpolski.

Cossacks were to stop raiding Ottoman territories, return artillery pieces captured from the Poles, and Fedorovych was to be removed from his position of authority among the Cossacks. The number of registered Cossacks was increased to 8,000.

T. Fedorovych criticized the treaty which failed to put an end to the raising Polish-Cossack tensions.

See also
 History of the Cossacks
 Treaty of Kurukove
 Treaty of Pereyaslav (1654)
 Pereyaslav Articles

17th century in the Zaporozhian Host
Poland–Ukraine military relations
1630 treaties
Pereyaslav (1630)
1630 in the Polish–Lithuanian Commonwealth